The Federation of Disability Sport Wales is the national pan-disability governing body of sports organisations that provides local sporting and physical activity opportunities to disabled people in Wales.

The Federation of Disability Sport Wales is based at the Sport Wales National Centre, Sophia Gardens, Cardiff.

References

Disability
Wales
Organisations based in Cardiff
Parasports in Wales
Disability organisations based in Wales